The 2019 Challenger Banque Nationale de Saguenay was a professional tennis tournament played on indoor hard courts. It was the fourteenth edition of the tournament which was part of the 2019 ITF Women's World Tennis Tour. It took place in Saguenay, Quebec, Canada between 21 and 27 October 2019.

Singles main-draw entrants

Seeds

 1 Rankings are as of 14 October 2019.

Other entrants
The following players received wildcards into the singles main draw:
  Jada Bui
  Mélodie Collard
  Raphaëlle Lacasse
  Maria Tanasescu

The following players received entry from the qualifying draw:
  Ariana Arseneault
  Ayan Broomfield
  Sarah-Maude Fortin
  Jasmin Jebawy
  Jessica Livianu
  Anna Morgina
  Kennedy Shaffer
  Marina Stakusic

The following player received entry as a lucky loser:
  Safiya Carrington

Champions

Singles

 Indy de Vroome def.  Robin Anderson, 3–6, 6–4, 7–5

Doubles

 Mélodie Collard /  Leylah Annie Fernandez def.  Samantha Murray /  Bibiane Schoofs, 7–6(7–3), 6–2

References

External links
 2019 Challenger Banque Nationale de Saguenay at ITFtennis.com
 Official website

2019 ITF Women's World Tennis Tour
2019 in Canadian tennis
October 2019 sports events in Canada
Challenger de Saguenay